Timeslip is a horizontally scrolling shooter written by Jon Williams for the Commodore 16 / Commodore Plus/4 computers and published by English Software in 1985. Atari 8-bit version followed a year later. The game was described by reviewers as "three versions of Scramble rolled into one".

Gameplay

In Timeslip the player is presented with the screen divided into three sections or time zones. The top section is the planet surface with the player controlling a fighter, the middle section is set in underground cavers, and in the bottom section the player controls a mini-sub. The object of the game is to destroy 36 orbs placed within the three sections and synchronize the clocks in all three zones to 00.00 hours. If a player is hit, they receive a 30 minute penalty. In addition, if a player is hit five times, a "timeslip" occurs, which is a desynchronisation of all clocks. Sections are played one at a time and the player can switch zones at will, leaving the other two frozen in time.

Reception
Timeslip received mostly positive reviews. Your Commodore reviewer summed up Timeslip as the best game he had seen on the C16, and he recommended it without hesitation. The review in Computer and Video Games magazine was equally positive: "Timeslip's designer and programmer, Jon Williams, has come up with a nifty and exciting little game. C16 owners should raise three cheers for him "

References

External links
Timeslip at Atari Mania
 

1985 video games
Atari 8-bit family games
Commodore 16 and Plus/4 games
Horizontally scrolling shooters
English Software games